The Allen & Company Sun Valley Conference is an annual media finance conference hosted and funded by private investment firm Allen & Company. The conference has taken place in Sun Valley, Idaho for one week each July since 1983.  The gathering typically includes major political figures, business leaders, and figures in the philanthropic and cultural spheres.

Previous conference guests have included Bill and Melinda Gates, Jeff Bezos, Elon Musk, Warren and Susan Buffett, Tony Blair, Google founders Larry Page and Sergey Brin, Allen alumnus and former Philippine Senator Mar Roxas, former Google Chairman Eric Schmidt, Quicken Loans Founder & Chairman Dan Gilbert, Yahoo! co-founder Jerry Yang, financer George Soros, Facebook founder Mark Zuckerberg, media mogul Rupert Murdoch, eBay CEO Meg Whitman, BET founder Robert Johnson, Time Warner Chairman Richard Parsons, Nike founder and chairman Phil Knight, Dell founder and CEO Michael Dell, NBA player LeBron James, Professor and entrepreneur Sebastian Thrun, Governor Chris Christie, entertainer Dan Chandler, Katharine Graham of The Washington Post, Diane Sawyer, InterActiveCorp Chairman Barry Diller, Linkedin co-founder Reid Hoffman, entrepreneur Wences Casares, EXOR and FCA Chairman John Elkann, and Washington Post CEO Donald E. Graham, Ivanka Trump and Jared Kushner, Bob Iger, Warner Bros. Discovery CEO David Zaslav, Oprah Winfrey., and more.

Allen & Company is a private investment firm formed in 1922, with headquarters in New York City and London.  Allen & Company has advised, helped found, and/or invested in companies including BET, InterActiveCorp, Oxygen Media, Discovery Communications, News Corporation, the Coca-Cola Corporation and Google.

See also 
 Allen & Company
 Herbert Allen, Jr.

References

External links 
 
 
 
 
 
 When Private Jets Ferry Billionaires to Small-Town Idaho

Business conferences
Recurring events established in 1983
Blaine County, Idaho
July events